Calcialiment is an animal feed producer based in Brittany.

History 
Calcialiment was founded in 1930 in Brittany. As a family business specialising in animal nutrition, the company has developed around 3 core areas: minerals for producing livestock farmers, infancy feed, and premix for industrial farmers.

1935: Théophile Lognone, a watchmakers & jeweller in the Mont Saint-Michel Bay area, noticed that the eggs produced by his hens were stronger and hatched better when he gave them bits of shell to peck. His discovery earned him the first prize at the 1936 Ministry of Agriculture Competition.

1937: He set up a company that specialised in feed for laying hens.

1952: His sons Pierre and Xavier shifted the company’s activity towards mineral feed for pigs and, in 1955, created the first Breton “Piétrain” breed pig farm.

Nowadays, Calcialiment is managed by Yves Reneaume and François Lognone; the historical owner is the company president. The company employs 100 people, working at 4 production sites. Calcialiment has expanded to operate at the national level.

DLG Group 
Calcialiment-Vilofoss is owned partly by Vitfoss and by DLG, which is one of the biggest premix producers in Europe.

References

Agriculture companies established in 1930
Manufacturing companies established in 1930
Companies based in Brittany
Agriculture companies of France
French companies established in 1930